was the eldest son of Matsudaira Ieyasu.

Biography
Nobuyasu was Ieyasu's first son. His mother was Lady Tsukiyama, daughter of Imagawa Yoshimoto. His childhood name was Takechiyo (竹千代).

As a child Nobuyasu was sent to the Imagawa capital of Sunpu, located in Suruga Province (modern-day Shizuoka Prefecture) as a hostage. Later he was named keeper of Okazaki Castle in Mikawa Province (modern-day Aichi Prefecture), the birthplace of his father, and took part in the Battle of Nagashino in 1575.

It is generally believed that Nobuyasu's mother and his wife, the Lady Tokuhime, daughter of Oda Nobunaga, did not get along.  It's possible that Lady Tsukiyama was jealous of the attention her son paid to his young wife.  In 1579, whether out of a desire for revenge or to remove her mother-in-law's meddling in their marriage, Tokuhime wrote a letter to her father Oda Nobunaga, accusing her mother-in-law of a treasonous plot with the Takeda clan.  When Nobunaga brought the allegations to the attention of Ieyasu, he had his wife confined and then executed, to allay any suspicions of his ally.  Nobuyasu was confined to Ohama and then Futamata Castle, where he received his father's order to commit suicide (seppuku), in a letter which stated that Ieyasu understood that Nobuyasu may not have been guilty of any treasonous act, or even knew anything about it, but he understood that Nobuyasu would feel obligated to avenge his mother.  The possibility of revenge was an unacceptable risk to Ieyasu, and the only solution was that Nobuyasu should kill himself for the integrity and security of the clan.  Nobuyasu committed seppuku and killed himself on 5 October 1579, or the 15th day of the 9th month, of the year Tenshō-9, by the traditional Japanese calendar.

Nobuyasu is not believed to have been a popular figure in his time, as his demise might attest. In particular, supposedly Sakai Tadatsugu declined to refute any suspicions of treason, due to his personal disregard for Nobuyasu.

Issue
 , who married Ogasawara Hidemasa of Matsumoto Domain
 Kumahime, who married Honda Tadamasa
 Banchiyo, who was the son of a concubine

References
Griffis, William (1883). The Mikado's Empire, Book I. New York: Harper & Brothers, p. 272
 

1559 births
1579 deaths
Tokugawa clan
Suicides by seppuku
Deified Japanese people